Forbidden Voices is a documentary film by director Barbara Miller about the fight for human rights and freedom of speech of three female bloggers: Yoani Sánchez from Cuba, Zeng Jinyan from China and Farnaz Seifi from Iran.

The film Forbidden Voices explores the motivation and goals of the online activists' struggle and traces the consequences and political repressions the three women are facing for their courageous activism. The documentary won the Amnesty International Award 2013 and the WACC SIGNIS Human Rights Award 2012, and was nominated for the Swiss Film Award and the Prix de Soleure in 2013.

Internet censorship and repression 
Forbidden Voices describes how Internet access in Cuba is still prohibited for the average citizen, and Internet censorship in China and Internet access in Iran are very harsh, the blogs of the three protagonists are censored, blocked or even shut-down by their governments. Seen by their governments as dissidents the bloggers are often under surveillance and facing harsh repressions. Yoani Sánchez has been beaten and arrested, as well as publicly defamed on Cuban State TV for fighting for human rights in Cuba;  Zeng Jinyan lived for years with her husband Hu Jia and her new born daughter under house arrest in Beijing for their fight for human rights in China; and Farnaz Seifi has been arrested for her fight for gender equality in Iran and forced in to exile.

Premier and awards 
The award-winning documentary Forbidden Voices premiered at the 2012 Visions du Réel Film Festival in Nyon, Switzerland, and had its International Premiere at IDFA, The International Documentary Film Festival Amsterdam.

Awards:
 2012: WACC-SIGNIS Human Rights Award: Forbidden Voices (Toronto, Canada)
 2012: Amnesty International Award (Human Rights Film Festival San Sebastian, Spain): Forbidden Voices 
 2012: Nomination Swiss Film Prize/Best Documentary: Forbidden Voices
 2013: Nomination Prix de Soleure at the Solothurn Film Festival

Reviews 
 "Forbidden Voices is a compelling and deeply disturbing documentary that makes those of us who freely sit at our laptops and type realize how much we take for granted, and how powerful these women's voices are in their repressive societies." (Review by Leah Kolb, Bitch Flicks)
 "This is a humbling documentary for a reporter to watch. Following three bloggers whose beat is their government's oppression, we see the extreme lengths they go to tell the world their stories: They bear house arrest, get beaten up by police, live for years in exile. ... Yet despite the misery these women's governments put them through, Forbidden Voices is hopeful: Information can no longer be managed by the state. That's largely because of technology, but equally due to the spirit of women like Sanchez, Farnaz, and Zeng." (Review Forbidden Voices, by Daniel Person, Seattle Weekly)
 "The film opens with blood-curdling screams of Yoani Sánchez. The Cuban blogger fought in February 2010 against an ambush-style arrest by the secret police, and the courageous woman was able to achieve in that critical moment the impossible, namely to operate unnoticed the recording button on her mobile phone. The ugly face of the ubiquitous apparatus of repression in the realm of the Castro brothers who still enjoy in certain circles a residual prestige ("After all, Cuba has a free health and education system for all"), could hardly be shown more impressively then as with this dramatic opening sequence." (Review Forbidden Voices, by Geri Krebs, NZZ)

Additional press 
 CNN: Forbidden Voices: Female bloggers fight for freedom of speech
 Bitch Flicks: Documentary Explores the Forbidden Voices of Three Female Bloggers 
 Seattle Weekly News: Review of Forbidden Voices
 Deutsche Welle (TV): Video summary on Forbidden Voices
 Reporters Without Borders: Forbidden Voices - Film Tribute To Three Exceptional Women Bloggers
 Women Make Movies: Women Make Movies article on Forbidden Voices
 SRF (Swiss TV) article: Forbidden Voices - Forbidden Votes

References

External links 

 
 
 

2012 films
Documentary films about human rights
Films about freedom of expression
2012 documentary films
Documentary films about women
Swiss documentary films
Documentary films about the Internet